The Canal de la Nieppe was part of the Hazebrouck Canals. It connected to the River Lys at Thiennes with a second connection to the River Lys at Merville.  It was 23 km with 4 locks.  The other canals composing the Hazebrouck canals are the Canal de Préaven, Canal de la Bourre, Canal d'Hazebrouck.

See also
 List of canals in France

References

External links
 Project Babel

Nieppe